21st Visual Effects Society Awards
February 15, 2023

Outstanding Visual Effects in a Photoreal Feature:
Avatar: The Way of Water

Outstanding Visual Effects in a Photoreal Episode:
The Lord of the Rings: The Rings of Power - "Udûn"

The 21st Visual Effects Society Awards is an awards ceremony presented by the Visual Effects Society to recognize the best in visual effects in film, television and other media in 2022. Nominations were announced on January 17, 2023, and the ceremony took place on February 15, 2023. Avatar: The Way of Water received a record number of nominations with fourteen, surpassing the number of previous nominations for film (Avatar) and television (The Mandalorian). The society introduced a new "Emerging Technology Award" this year.

Nominees

Honorary Awards 
Lifetime Achievement Award:
Gale Anne Hurd  

VES Award for Creative Excellence
Eric Roth

Film

Television

Other categories

References

External links 
 Visual Effects Society

Visual Effects Society Awards
2022 film awards
2022 television awards
Award ceremonies